Christopher W. Jones is an American chemical engineer and researcher on catalysis and carbon dioxide capture.  In 2022 he is the John Brock III School Chair and Professor of Chemical & Biomolecular Engineering and Adjunct Professor of Chemistry and Biochemistry at the Georgia Institute of Technology, in Atlanta, GA.  Previously he served as Associate Vice President for Research at Georgia Tech (2013-2019), including a stint as Interim Executive Vice-President for Research in 2018.

Early life and education
Jones was born in Michigan, where he graduated from Troy High School in 1991.  He earned a bachelor's degree from the University of Michigan and masters and doctorate degrees from the California Institute of Technology, all in chemical engineering.  Following a post-doctoral appointment in chemistry and chemical engineering at the California Institute of Technology, he joined the faculty at the Georgia Institute of Technology in 2000.

Career
Jones has been recognized for his contributions to research in catalysis by the American Chemical Society with the Ipatieff Prize in 2010, the North American Catalysis Society with the Paul H. Emmett Award in Fundamental Catalysis in 2013 and the American Society of Engineering Education with the Curtis W. McGraw Research Award, also in 2013.  The American Institute of Chemical Engineers recognized him as a leading mid-career researcher in 2017 with the Andreas Acrivos Award for Professional Progress in Chemical Engineering.  He was elected to the National Academy of Engineering in 2022 for his contributions to the design and synthesis of catalytic materials and for advancing technologies related to carbon capture and sequestration.

In scholarly publishing, Jones has led multiple successful new journals.  In 2011, he was selected by the American Chemical Society (ACS) as the Founding Editor-in-Chief of the new interdisciplinary catalysis journal, ACS Catalysis, which was recognized by the Association of American Publishers as the Best New Journal in Science, Technology & Medicine in 2012. In 2020, he was named the founding Editor-in-Chief of the new open access chemistry journal JACS Au, which is also published by the ACS.  He has over 300 journal publications and patents.

Jones conducts research in the field of direct air capture, an approach to the mitigation of climate change in which carbon dioxide is extracted from the atmosphere for sequestration as a means to reduce the global atmospheric carbon dioxide level.  Jones is a leading researcher on the use of solid materials containing amines to capture carbon dioxide from air and other ultra-dilute gases, and has partnered with Global Thermostat, LLC, as well as other firms, to develop commercial technologies based on his research in adsorption.  

In 2016 Jones published a comprehensive review of materials and technologies for direct air capture. In 2017-2018, he co-led the study of direct air capture technologies and identified knowledge gaps and research needs as part of the US National Academies study of carbon dioxide removal and negative emissions technologies.  His updated perspective on research needs in direct air capture was published in 2022.

References

External links
Google Scholar Report

Year of birth missing (living people)
Living people
American chemical engineers
Georgia Tech people
University of Michigan College of Engineering alumni
California Institute of Technology alumni
Academic journal editors